Khodabandehlu Rural District is a rural district (dehestan) in the Central District of Sahneh County, Kermanshah Province, Iran. At the 2006 census, its population was 3,389, in 885 families. The rural district has 22 villages.

References 

Rural Districts of Kermanshah Province
Sahneh County